Givaran (also Romanized as Gīvarān; also known as Gīvmarān) is a village in Shaab Jereh Rural District, Toghrol Al Jerd District, Kuhbanan County, Kerman Province, Iran. At the 2006 census, its population was 16, in 4 families.

References 

Populated places in Kuhbanan County